Ultimate Challenge MMA (also referred to as UCMMA) is a mixed martial arts promotion based in the United Kingdom. It is shown live on London Live in the UK, Fight Now TV in the US and on Viewster in several other countries.

History
The collapse of EliteXC was quickly followed by Cage Rage with its final show Cage Rage 28 in 2008.  Later that same year Dave O'Donnell, one of the original owners of Cage Rage, created Ultimate Challenge UK.  Their first event 'Bad Breed' covered the spot where Cage Rage 29 was going to take place.

After a while of promoting many successful events, UCUK dropped the 'UK' out of the name and replaced it with 'MMA' becoming 'UCMMA'.  UCMMA has been steadily approaching the same popularity that Cage Rage once enjoyed.

They have sponsorships with companies like Cash4Gold, Official Watches, MMA Sports Nutrition, and Coalition fight music.

On August 6, 2011, UCMMA 22 - Warrior Creed was shown on PPV channel Primetime.

UCMMA can now be watched on Fight Now TV in the United States in a landmark deal for the promotion. The contract with the network is set for 1 year as of February 2012.

All of UCMMA events from UCMMA 26 - The Real Deal can be purchased from high street retail stores such as Tesco, HMV, and Argos. It can also be purchased at online stores like Zavvi.com, Amazon.com, Lovefilm and The Hut Group.

On May 28, 2012, UCMMA was featured on BBC One programme How To Beat Pain, which was presented by Greg Whyte and Jack Krindler.

After White Collar MMA 6 (WCMMA), UK casting call were taken place at the Troxy for a new American reality show - Warrior Island. Dave O'Donnell hosted the casting call at the request by Global Proving Ground (GPG) President, James Jefferson. The reality show will be directed by Hollywood veteran Ben Perry.

On October 25 it was announced that, along with BAMMA and Cage Warriors, that UCMMA have united with The Centre of Health and Human Performance in London to launched SAFE MMA, a nonprofit organization established to improve the safety of MMA fighters in the U.K. Chief among the organization's plans is a centralized and confidential database for fighter medical records. SAFE MMA, which officially launches Jan. 1 2013, also will provide affordable, standardized blood and medical tests for all registered fighters, as well as advice from leading world experts in sports medicine, according to today's announcement.

As of November 21, 2012, UCMMA can also be seen on Canada's The Fight Network.

After Sky Sports cut out all MMA programming from their channels, UCMMA announced that they signed a deal with on-demand channel Primetime for a live broadcasting partnership.

Cage Fighter
They show their chat show, Cage Fighter, every Wednesday night on Sky Sports. Dave O'Donnell hosts the 30 minute show with Grant Waterman and interviews MMA fighters, shows clips of previous fights, GYM of the week, KO/Submission of the week and advertises their next event.

UK1
UCMMA also shows kickboxing matches during their events, referring to them as 'UK1', named after the well known K-1 kickboxing company based in Japan. Because they hold these fights in the same events as they show MMA, the kickboxers use the cage to compete in.

Each fight will be a three 3 minute round with a minute rest period in between rounds, and if it's a draw one more round will be fought. Each round will be scored using the 10-point must system. Fighters using the most effective aggression and effective technique will win the round. Also the three knock-down rule applies, and a fighter can only be saved from a count by the bell in the final round. the choice to use MMA gloves or standard kickboxing gloves are agreed to by both fighters. Because of the pace of the action, if fighters get into a clinch they will be allowed a single knee strike and then must break clean. If the referee says ‘break’ they must not hit on the break. Rules are set so that certain things that are allowed in MMA are not used in the UK1 bouts, such as standing/clinching elbow strikes, ground fighting (grappling or striking), trips, takedowns or throws.

Since its first bouts, it has gained popularity, as it makes their fight card more exciting and keeps the audience entertained if the prior fights were boring due to slow pace striking or grappling. It also allows the company to reach the type of audience that dislikes the use of small 6oz MMA gloves, grappling and striking to a grounded opponent. There are also titles in each weight division, which follows the same as their MMA divisions.

White Collar MMA (WCMMA)
Dave O'Donnell created White Collar MMA (WCMMA), with the idea that "gives the average man the chance to experience the thrill of hand to hand combat inside the octagon. Competing in the disciplines of boxing, kick boxing, Muay Thai and MMA, WCMMA lets nine to fivers take the frustrations of the office out on the man to stands toe – 2 - toe with them in the cage." He says: ‘Every man who sits behind his desk at work watches MMA fights on YouTube or at home on TV can now give it a go. WCMMA gives that man the chance to live the dream. These guys will compete against each other in three 90 seconds rounds in a safe and controlled environment putting their skills to the test in a safe arena against fellow nine to fivers.’

Dave will make sure that all fights are fair and each competitor is in the right condition to fight. There will not be cost cuts on production will give them the opportunity to make their dreams come true. This will be their chance to become Rocky for one night. They will also hold amateur and semi-pro fights as well to allow amateur mixed martial artists a chance to grow their skills before going professional.

Ultimate Ball
UCMMA created a new sport inside MMA during the early part of 2012 called 'Ultimate Ball'. The team-based sport, which combines sports such as rugby, American football, basketball and mixed martial arts, is played in the cage in which both sides try to get the rugby-shaped ball into the opposition's goal, with takedowns and body shots allowed. Ultimate Ball debut at UCMMA 27.

The concept to Ultimate Ball came to Dave O'Donnell around the time Cage Rage was at its highest peak, but had to wait until UCMMA grew bigger to make the sport happen.

The rules to Ultimate Ball are:
 Two five-minute rounds
 If there is a draw after ten minutes, then a one-minute additional time and the first player to score wins the game.
 If after the one-minute extra time it is still a draw, it goes into penalty shootout until one time takes the lead.
 To score, the ball must stay in the net to count.
 One player can't score straight away until a teammate scores the next goal.
 The ball must be passed twice before scoring a goal.
 Four to a team, three active and one player must be sub (32-foot cage will have five players).
 A team must have different fighter from Heavyweight downwards.
 Heavyweight must be no more than 120 kilograms. 
 Subs must be Welterweight or below.
 Substitution can only be made when a player is injured or at half time.
 A red-carded player must sit out for 1 min of the game.
 Restart from the centre of the cage.
 At start of game and any restart, all players must be behind the ball.
 Strikes and takedowns are allowed when a player has the ball (push kicks, punches to body, trips, sweeps and takedowns).
 No punches on the floor, only grappling to get the ball.
 Only the referee will decide who gets the restart, i.e. the player in possession of the ball.
 If both players have the ball, referee will call a chest start (both players with chest on ball, with hands behind back until referee blows whistle to continue play).
 If the ball goes out of the cage, the other team gets the restart.
 If a player hits another player who doesn't have the ball deliberately, he will be sent off and a substitute cannot be used.
 All players must be medically checked before taking part.
 All players must wear groin and mouth guards while taking part.

Ultimate Ball tournament

UCMMA events

Scheduled events

Past events

Current champions

MMA champions

Current 'UK1' champions

Notable fighters in the UCMMA
The following have also competed for top tier promotions such as UFC 	
	
Oli Thompson	
James McSweeney	
Jimi Manuwa
Zelg Galešić	
Tom Watson	
Karlos Vemola	
Mark Weir	
John Maguire
Paul Kelly
Ross Pointon
Jason Young 	
Brad Pickett	

Other promotions
	
Linton Vassell	
Alex Reid
Michael Page
Jason Barrett
Wesley '2Play' Johnson

References

External links
Ultimate Challenge event results on Sherdog

2008 establishments in the United Kingdom
Mixed martial arts organizations
Sports organisations of the United Kingdom
Sports organizations established in 2008
Mixed martial arts events lists